Harlem is the New York City neighborhood (in a northern portion of the island and the borough of Manhattan).

Harlem also may refer to:

People 
 Gro Harlem Brundtland, Norwegian former prime minister
 Harlem Désir, French politician

Places  
 Municipalities:
 Haarlem (sometimes spelled "Harlem" in English), a city in the Netherlands
 In United States: 
 Harlem, California
 Harlem, Florida
 Harlem, Georgia
 Harlem, Illinois (disambiguation)
 Harlem, Montana
 Harlem, Ohio
 Other features of the United States:
 Features of New York City:
 Harlem River, a tidal strait east of Manhattan Island
 Features and institutions on the island of, and of the borough of, Manhattan:
 Harlem–125th Street station of inter-city railroad 

 Harlem Meer, Central Park, a lake in Central Park

 Neighborhoods:
 Harlem (also listed above as primary topic bearing the name)

 East Harlem, AKA Spanish Harlem
 Success Academy Charter Schools, body incorporating 8 former "Success Academy Harlem ..." institutions

 Northeastern Illinois stations of Chicago Transit Authority:
 Harlem station (CTA Blue Line Congress branch) 
 Harlem station (CTA Blue Line O'Hare branch) 
 Harlem/Lake station

 Club Harlem, a former nightclub in Atlantic City, New Jersey, United States of America

Music 
 Harlem (band), an Austin, Texas indie rock group
 Harlem Yu, a Taiwanese singer
 Harlem Spartans, a UK drill group also known as "Harlem"

Albums
 Harlem (album), by Shawn Amos

Songs
 Harlem (Ellington), a 1951 symphonic jazz piece by Duke Ellington
 "Harlem" (New Politics song), by the Danish rock group New Politics
 "Harlem", a 1971 single by Bill Withers
 "Harlem", by DJ Kay Slay from the album The Streetsweeper, Vol. 2

Other
 Harlem (horse), a racehorse, winner of two Australian Cups
 Harlem, a one-issue publication by the Niggerati
 "Harlem" (poem), a 1951 poem by Langston Hughes
 Harlem, a 1929 play by Wallace Thurman and William Jourdan Rapp
 Harlem (TV series), a 2021 American TV series on Amazon Prime Video

See also 
 Haarlem (disambiguation)
 Spanish Harlem (disambiguation)
 West Harlem (disambiguation)
 Former American professional wrestling tag-teams:
 Harlem Heat  
 The Harlem Knights
Harlem station (disambiguation)
 Harlem Shuffle (disambiguation)
 Harlem shake (disambiguation)